Baba Sheydollah (also Romanized as Bābā Sheydollāh; also known as Bāba Saidullah) is a village in Chaharduli-ye Sharqi Rural District, Chaharduli District, Qorveh County, Kurdistan Province, Iran. At the 2006 census, its population was 501, in 113 families. The village is populated by Azerbaijanis.

References 

Towns and villages in Qorveh County
Azerbaijani settlements in Kurdistan Province